Konglish, more formally Korean-style English is a style of English used by Korean speakers.

The name is a portmanteau of the names of the two languages and was first recorded earliest in 1975. Other less common terms are Korlish (recorded from 1988), Korenglish (1992), Korglish (2000) and Kinglish (2000).

Konglish comprises English loanwords that have been appropriated into Korean and includes many that are used in ways that are not readily understandable to native English speakers. A common example is the Korean term "hand phone" for the English "mobile phone". Konglish also has direct English loanwords, mistranslations from English to Korean, or pseudo-English words coined in Japan that came to Korean usage.

The use of Konglish is widespread in South Korea as a result of U.S. cultural influence, but it is not familiar to North Koreans.

English is also found in the physical domains of the main streets, restaurants, and shopping areas in Seoul and the rest of South Korea. Sociolinguistically, South Koreans would use English to represent luxury, youth, sophistication, and modernity.

Overview
A possible explanation behind South Korea's acceptance and rapid integration of English into the Korean language and culture may lie in the overall South Korean attitude towards globalization. English-learning has become prevalent in South Korean society, which Joseph Sung-Yul Park, in his 2009 paper, attributes to three primary developments and qualities - necessitation, externalization, and self-deprecation. Park believes necessitation stems from the general Korean belief that learning English is a must to succeed in the globalizing world, whereas externalization refers to treating English as the language of the so-called "other", opposite to the Korean identity. Finally, self-deprecation refers to Park's belief that Koreans think that they are viewed by the world to not be competent in their usage of English.

The English language has become so interpenetrated into the Korean language that English makes up over 90% of the loanwords in the Korean lexicon today, and there continue to be debates among Korean linguists over whether establishing the national language of South Korea as English would be a prudent decision in the globalizing world. In fact, Harkness attributes this development in South Korean society as a sign of South Korean ambivalence towards its engagement with the rest of the world to an extent.

On the contrary, however, North Korea has undergone a systematic purging of its language, eliminating its reliance on foreign influences. In fact, language is viewed not only as a useful tool to further its propaganda, but also as a 'weapon' to reinforce its ideology and the "building of socialism". Today, the North Korean language, which was officially established as "Munhwaŏ", or "cultured language", in 1966, consists of nativized Sino-Korean vocabulary and has eliminated foreign loan words from the North Korean lexicon. These steps first included its decolonization process in an attempt to re-establish a unique "North Korean" identity, eliminating the Japanese language and culture that had deeply penetrated the Korean peninsula during the decades of Japanese annexation. Additionally, it continued to resist adopting loan words from foreign sources, especially when it came to English - thus, there are barely, if any, "Konglish" terms in the North Korean language.

History 
Korea became a colony of Japan between 1910 and 1945. During the colonial period, Japanese was the main language through which English terms of communication were imported into Korea, especially at times when teaching and speaking Korean was prohibited. As Japan actively imported Western culture and technology in the years that followed, the earliest English loanwords evolved gradually through this Japanese influence. For example, one of the well-known words is "커피" which originates from the word "coffee". After the Second World War, U.S. culture and language had a deeper influence on Koreans with the arrival of the U.S. army. The popularity of the use of English in the Korean language also increased. According to data at the time, up to 10% of Korean vocabulary came from and was changed from English. Thus, Konglish was adopted with increasing usage during the years of U.S. presence in Korea.

Category 
Konglish is relatively understudied and also varied in definition across individuals. However, some experts would agree that its formation parallels that of pidgins and creoles, but can't be defined as those categories because it is not yet its own category of English, but rather a subcategory of Korean that is conceptualized in the form of English words and phrases integrated with the Korean language.

Although Konglish is ambiguous in its category of linguistics, it is similar to the definition of Platt's "New Englishes", which is distinguished from erroneous or temporary forms of English. Konglish aligns with the standards of "New Englishes": developed through the education system, developed in an area where English is not the native language spoken by most of the population, used for a range of functions among the speakers, and has been localized by adopting some language feature of its own like intonation patterns and expressions.

Laterals 
Many Koreans who immigrate to the United States and learn English have a distinct Korean-English variation, especially in early stages of acquisition. One reason this is so is due to distinct laterals between English and Korean languages, which affects the articulatory and acoustic characteristics of the languages. American English is often described as having "dark" variants, which involves a primary alveolar contact gesture as well as a secondary dorsal retraction gesture. In most cases, English in America is spoken with very little anterior contact in the mouth, and instead uses the narrowed upper pharyngeal area with a retracted tongue dorsum. The Korean lateral on the other hand is considered to be "light" in its acoustic and articulatory characteristics. The two gestures that make up the Korean lateral include tongue tip closure and palatalization, which involves the raising of the tongue body.

According to the Speech Learning Model, learning a second language is easier in later stages of acquisition for laterals that are more different than similar because one can recognize the differences in speech sounds more clearly. This is true for Koreans learning English, as they use distinct articulatory tongue shapes, using a low tongue body and a heavily retracted tongue dorsum for their English word-final lateral, similar to native English speakers.

In loanwords used in Konglish, the dark English lateral is often mapped onto the loanwords Koreans use, showing that Koreans see these loanwords as separate from purely Korean, even though it is used in everyday life.

Examples 
These two lists of Konglish terms, the second being loan words that arrived via Japanese influence, are intended to contain Konglish terms not readily understandable to a native English speaker, similar to wasei-eigo terms in the Japanese language. Many Konglish terms were invented by Koreans through non-standard abbreviations or combinations of English words or by applying a new meaning or usage to a common English word.

While English words may have reached Korea via globalization, modernization, etc.) social and linguistic factors had an impact in the shift of meaning of the words introduced as they were propagated through the community. An example of a Korean false friend is the word "", which sounds like "meeting" in English but means "blind date".

A trend in the naming of apartment buildings in Seoul is blending English words together because developers believe this will enhance the luxury brand image of the properties. Some examples of apartment names with blended English words include: Luxtige, Blesstige, Tristige and Forestige, XI; these words are combinations of luxury, bless, prestige, trinity, forest, extra and intelligence.

Loanwords from Japan 

Many loanwords entered into Korean from Japan, especially during the Japanese forced occupation, when the teaching and speaking of Korean was prohibited. Those Konglish words are loanwords from, and thus similar to, Wasei-eigo used in Japan.

A simple example would be how the meaning of the English word "cunning" changes when used in a Konglish sentence. In South Korea, keonning means cheating, as the loanword was adapted from Japanglish kanningu, which means "cheating". Konglish words may or may not have a similar meaning to the original word when used, and a well-known brand name can become a generalized trademark and replace the general word: older Korean people tend to use the word babari ("Burberry") or babari-koteu ("Burberry coat"), which came from Japanese bābari-kōto (meaning "gabardine raincoat") to refer to all trench coats. Coats made by Burberry are called beobeori-koteu, rather than babari-koteu in Korean (as the brand name, entered to Korean language directly from English, is Beobeori). Some examples such as "Burberry" and "fighting" can be considered pseudo-anglicisms as they follow certain traits: use native words in conjunction with an English suffix like -ting or -ism to create a word that does not exist in the English language. The word "fighting" (화이팅)is an instance of this. Words like" Burberry" (바바리) are invented through other means due to social or cultural elements. The use of "Burberry"(바바리) over trench coats can be compared to Kleenex’s usage over tissue.

Compared to Japanese, both English and Korean have more vowels and permit more coda consonants. Oftentimes when Japanesized English words enter into the Korean language, the "original" English words from which the Japanglish words were derived are reverse-traced, and the words undergo de-Japanesization (sometimes with hypercorrection).

Pseudo-Konglish loanwords 
Some foreign-origin words such as areubaiteu ("part-time"), a loanword from German  ("work"), are sometimes mistakenly considered as Konglish and are corrected into "accurate" English loanword forms such as pateutaim.

Criticism 
Creative use of the English language by Koreans learning English as a foreign language has also been referred to as Konglish. Using English words in daily conversation, advertising, and entertainment is seen as "trendy" and "cool". However this use can often lead to misunderstandings due to problems with pronunciation, grammar or vocabulary.

Modern use of Konglish has already created a linguistic divide between North Korea and South Korea. North Korean defectors can have trouble integrating into South Korean society because much of the Konglish used there is not used in North Korea. This can lead to confusion, misunderstandings and delay in integration into the society. This is not the sole cause of the linguistic divide between the two nations as some Korean words are also used differently between the two countries. While Konglish problems exist between the North and South they also exist between the metropolitan and rural. Ahn Jung-hyo, a Korean-English translator who is the author of "A False English Dictionary," was noted for saying that improper use of Konglish in other countries is likely to bring shame to Korea. However, John Huer, a columnist for Korea Times, noted Konglish usage as one of his "10 Most Wonderful Things About Korea". He felt that it was both inventive and clever. After that article Huer criticized Koreans for their bad English and improper use of loanwords, though. Modern Konglish usage could even be viewed as art, yet there is a difference between a cultural use of a word like "Fighting!" and the bad grammar and vocabulary seen on signs, packages, and TV around Korea. Sebastian Harrisan has suggested that calling these kinds of things Konglish masks the problem with English education in Korea. The Korean government has been criticized by civic groups for their use of Konglish in slogans and focusing too much on English education. They feel that the heavy focus on English will damage the Korean language and doesn't benefit international competitiveness. In contrast, Jasper Kim, a law professor at Ewha Womans University, wrote that Konglish is necessary in a global context and that strict adherence to grammatical rules shouldn't trump getting the message across.

The spread of Konglish in the Korean language has been cited as a reason to increase Koreans' exposure to native English speakers, especially during their educational time. Koreans instructing others can lead to cementing errors into the language. Poor planning in the education system can result in unqualified Korean teachers being chosen to teach English with little or no time to prepare. These teachers end up using Konglish in the classroom. Even teachers who prepare may end up using official materials that contain numerous errors and Konglish. This can create a feeling of confusion towards learning structurally and technically correct English. Students look to teachers as the example and if teachers are making mistakes, these are passed on to them. The issue of bad Konglish has been raised in relation to tourism. There is a concern that poor English on signs, brochures, websites, or in other media might cause tourists to find another destination. This is a concern not just in small or remote venues, but even major international locations like Incheon Airport. When the airport was first opened for business more than 49 signs were found to contain English errors. In addition to keeping away tourists, Konglish usage can lead to the breakdown of business deals. Misunderstandings might lead a foreign business partner to lose confidence in a Korean company. In 2010, a poll showed that 44% of local governments in South Korea used an English phrase in their marketing slogan. The slogans at the time included: Lucky Dongjak, Dynamic Busan, Yes Gumi, Colorful Daegu, Ulsan for You, Happy Suwon, New Start! Yesan, Super Pyeongtaek, Hi-Touch Gongju, Nice Jecheon and Just Sangju.

There have also been debates on whether embracing English as another national language in Korea would be harmful to the country as it could bring destruction to South Korea's national identity. In order to embrace the importance of learning English for globalism as well as protect Korea's own language and identity, many Korean institutions encouraged the government to adopt English as a public language instead of an official language for cultural flexibility and familiarity with English.

See also 
 Contemporary culture of South Korea
 Engrish
 Pseudo-anglicism

References

External links 
An A to Z of Korean English (Konglish) expressions
koreanwikiproject.com Konglish

Education in South Korea
Korean language
Macaronic forms of English
South Korean culture
Society of South Korea